Oğuz Kağan Güçtekin (born 6 April 1999) is a Turkish professional footballer who plays as a defensive midfielder for Bandırmaspor on loan from the Belgian club  Westerlo.

Club career
Oğuz Kağan joined Fenerbahçe at the age 11 and begun as a striker, and eventually developed into a defensive sweeper. Oğuz Kağan made his professional debut for Fenerbahçe  in a 4-1 Süper Lig win over Sivasspor on 19 November 2017, coming in as a substitute in the 86th minute replacing Mehmet Topal. He transferred to the Belgian club Westerlo on 27 August 2021. On 1 August 2022, Güçtekin moved to Bandırmaspor on loan.

International career
Oğuz Kağan is a youth international for Turkey from U15 to U19 levels.

Honours 
Westerlo

 Belgian First Division B: 2021–22

References

External links
 
 
 
 
 Fenerbahçe profile

1999 births
Living people
Sportspeople from Mersin
Turkish footballers
Turkey youth international footballers
Fenerbahçe S.K. footballers
Çaykur Rizespor footballers
K.V.C. Westerlo players
Bandırmaspor footballers
Süper Lig players
Challenger Pro League players
Association football midfielders
Turkish expatriate footballers
Turkish expatriate sportspeople in Belgium
Expatriate footballers in Belgium